Scopalostoma is a genus of moths in the Carposinidae family.
At present this genus is only known from Réunion and contains the following species:

Species
Scopalostoma melanoparea Diakonoff, 1957
Scopalostoma nigromaculella Guillermet, 2004

References

 Afro Moths
Natural History Museum Lepidoptera generic names catalog

Carposinidae